Jamilah bint Adwan (born c. 180 CE) was the ancestor of the Islamic prophet Muhammad on both his paternal and maternal sides. She was the daughter of Adwan ibn Bariq of Banu Azd of Yemen. Jamilah was one of Malik ibn an-Nadr's wives and bore him Fihr, who was the progenitor of the Quraysh clan.

See also
Family tree of Muhammad

References

3rd-century women
3rd-century Arabs
Family of Muhammad
Banu Bariq
180s births
Year of birth uncertain
Year of death unknown